Judge Cooper may refer to:

Charles Cooper (judge) (1795–1887), Australian politician and the first Chief Justice of South Australia
Christopher R. Cooper (born 1966), judge of the United States District Court for the District of Columbia
Clarence Cooper (judge) (born 1942), judge of the United States District Court for the Northern District of Georgia
Florence-Marie Cooper (1940–2010), judge of the United States District Court for the Central District of California
Frank Cooper (judge) (1869–1946), judge of the United States District Court for the Northern District of New York
Irving Ben Cooper (1902–1996), judge of the United States District Court for the Southern District of New York
Mary Little Cooper (born 1946), judge of the United States District Court for the District of New Jersey
Robert Archer Cooper (1874–1953), judge of the United States District Court for the District of Puerto Rico
Samuel B. Cooper (1850–1918), American politician and member of the Board of General Appraisers

See also
Justice Cooper (disambiguation)